Abdul Qader Barmada (1911 – 18 December 2000), was a Syrian politician who was deputy for the Harem District in the Syrian Parliament for two terms (1943 and 1947). 

On 8 March 1963, Abdul Qader was one of 40 people sentenced to civil isolation for ten years.

References 

People from Aleppo
Barmada family
Syrian politicians
Syrian Sunni Muslims
1911 births
2000 deaths